is a Japanese digital artist, photographer, and composer. His first work was the ambient music album "Objectless", which released in 1983. His first work in the video game industry was Eastern Mind: The Lost Souls of Tong Nou, which first released in Japan for Classic Mac OS in 1994, and in North America for Microsoft Windows the following year. In 1998, he produced and composed the music for the video game LSD: Dream Emulator on the PlayStation, which later became his most recognizable work outside of Japan.

Works

Music 

 1983 – Objectless
 1994 – Transmigration
 1995 – Equal
 1997 – Linen Sampler
 1998 – LSD & Remixes
 1998 – Lucy in the Sky with Dynamites
 2017 – Mono (EP)
 2017 – Objectless (Classic Ambient Works and More)
 2017 – All Things Must Be Equal
 2018 – LSD Revamped
 2018 – Grateful in All Things
 2020 – Collected Ambient Grooves 1993 – 2001
 2020 – Transformed Collection

Video games 
 1994 –  (PC)
 1995 –  (PC)
 1997 –  (PC)
 1997 –  (PC)
 1998 – LSD: Dream Emulator (PS1)
 1999 –  (PS1)
 2000 –  (PS1)

Art books and publications 
 1991 – The Alphabetical Orgasm
 1992 – Anonymous Animals
 1993 – The Art of Computer Designing: A Black and White Approach
 1998 – LSD - Lovely Sweet Dream
 2017 – All Things Must Be Equal
 2020 – Grateful in All Things

Exhibitions 

 1991 – The Alphabetical Orgasm, Tokyo
 1992 – The Alphabetical Orgasm, Kyoto
 1992 – Anonymous Animals, Tokyo
 1998 – Osamu Sato and LSD Expo, Tokyo
 2017 – All Things Must Be Equal
 2018 – LSD Revamped ~Neo Psychedelia~, Tokyo
 2020 – Grateful in All Things,  Tokyo

Video works
 1994 – Compu Movie (VHS Tape)
 1994 – The Esoteric Retina (Video CD)

References

External links

1960 births
Japanese composers
Japanese graphic designers
Japanese male composers
Japanese multimedia artists
Japanese photographers
Living people
People from Kyoto
Japanese techno musicians
Video game artists
Digital artists